The 1968–69 New York Rangers season was the franchise's 43rd season. The Rangers finished in third place in the East Division with 91 points and advanced to the playoffs, where they lost to the Montreal Canadiens in the quarter-finals.

Regular season

Final standings

Record vs. opponents

Schedule and results

|- align="center" bgcolor="#FFBBBB"
| 1 || 13 || @ Chicago Black Hawks || 5–2 || 0–1–0
|- align="center" bgcolor="#CCFFCC"
| 2 || 16 || Philadelphia Flyers || 3–1 || 1–1–0
|- align="center" bgcolor="#FFBBBB"
| 3 || 17 || @ Detroit Red Wings || 7–2 || 1–2–0
|- align="center" bgcolor="#CCFFCC"
| 4 || 20 || Los Angeles Kings || 7–0 || 2–2–0
|- align="center" bgcolor="#CCFFCC"
| 5 || 23 || Oakland Seals || 6–1 || 3–2–0
|- align="center" bgcolor="#CCFFCC"
| 6 || 26 || @ Minnesota North Stars || 3–0 || 4–2–0
|- align="center" bgcolor="#FFBBBB"
| 7 || 27 || Toronto Maple Leafs || 5–3 || 4–3–0
|- align="center" bgcolor="#CCFFCC"
| 8 || 30 || Pittsburgh Penguins || 7–3 || 5–3–0
|- align="center" bgcolor="#CCFFCC"
| 9 || 31 || @ Philadelphia Flyers || 2–1 || 6–3–0
|-

|- align="center" bgcolor="#CCFFCC"
| 10 || 3 || Minnesota North Stars || 2–1 || 7–3–0
|- align="center" bgcolor="#FFBBBB"
| 11 || 6 || @ Los Angeles Kings || 2–0 || 7–4–0
|- align="center" bgcolor="#CCFFCC"
| 12 || 8 || @ Oakland Seals || 3–2 || 8–4–0
|- align="center" bgcolor="#CCFFCC"
| 13 || 10 || @ Chicago Black Hawks || 4–2 || 9–4–0
|- align="center" bgcolor="#FFBBBB"
| 14 || 13 || St. Louis Blues || 3–1 || 9–5–0
|- align="center" bgcolor="#CCFFCC"
| 15 || 16 || @ Pittsburgh Penguins || 2–1 || 10–5–0
|- align="center" bgcolor="#CCFFCC"
| 16 || 17 || Montreal Canadiens || 3–2 || 11–5–0
|- align="center" bgcolor="#CCFFCC"
| 17 || 20 || Los Angeles Kings || 4–2 || 12–5–0
|- align="center" bgcolor="#FFBBBB"
| 18 || 23 || @ Boston Bruins || 5–1 || 12–6–0
|- align="center" bgcolor="#CCFFCC"
| 19 || 24 || Oakland Seals || 3–2 || 13–6–0
|- align="center" bgcolor="#FFBBBB"
| 20 || 27 || Chicago Black Hawks || 4–2 || 13–7–0
|- align="center" bgcolor="#CCFFCC"
| 21 || 30 || @ Boston Bruins || 4–1 || 14–7–0
|-

|- align="center" bgcolor="#CCFFCC"
| 22 || 1 || Toronto Maple Leafs || 3–1 || 15–7–0
|- align="center" bgcolor="#CCFFCC"
| 23 || 4 || @ Montreal Canadiens || 4–2 || 16–7–0
|- align="center" bgcolor="#FFBBBB"
| 24 || 5 || @ Detroit Red Wings || 4–2 || 16–8–0
|- align="center" bgcolor="#FFBBBB"
| 25 || 7 || @ Toronto Maple Leafs || 5–2 || 16–9–0
|- align="center" bgcolor="#FFBBBB"
| 26 || 8 || Detroit Red Wings || 5–2 || 16–10–0
|- align="center" bgcolor="white"
| 27 || 11 || Boston Bruins || 2–2 || 16–10–1
|- align="center" bgcolor="#FFBBBB"
| 28 || 14 || @ Minnesota North Stars || 4–1 || 16–11–1
|- align="center" bgcolor="#FFBBBB"
| 29 || 15 || Philadelphia Flyers || 3–1 || 16–12–1
|- align="center" bgcolor="#FFBBBB"
| 30 || 18 || Chicago Black Hawks || 3–1 || 16–13–1
|- align="center" bgcolor="white"
| 31 || 21 || @ St. Louis Blues || 2–2 || 16–13–2
|- align="center" bgcolor="#CCFFCC"
| 32 || 22 || Minnesota North Stars || 4–2 || 17–13–2
|- align="center" bgcolor="white"
| 33 || 25 || @ Philadelphia Flyers || 2–2 || 17–13–3
|- align="center" bgcolor="#CCFFCC"
| 34 || 26 || Oakland Seals || 3–1 || 18–13–3
|- align="center" bgcolor="#FFBBBB"
| 35 || 28 || @ Montreal Canadiens || 5–3 || 18–14–3
|- align="center" bgcolor="#CCFFCC"
| 36 || 29 || Montreal Canadiens || 3–1 || 19–14–3
|-

|- align="center" bgcolor="#FFBBBB"
| 37 || 2 || Boston Bruins || 4–2 || 19–15–3
|- align="center" bgcolor="#FFBBBB"
| 38 || 4 || @ Toronto Maple Leafs || 5–3 || 19–16–3
|- align="center" bgcolor="#CCFFCC"
| 39 || 5 || Minnesota North Stars || 5–1 || 20–16–3
|- align="center" bgcolor="#CCFFCC"
| 40 || 9 || @ Philadelphia Flyers || 3–1 || 21–16–3
|- align="center" bgcolor="#FFBBBB"
| 41 || 11 || @ Detroit Red Wings || 3–2 || 21–17–3
|- align="center" bgcolor="#FFBBBB"
| 42 || 14 || @ Los Angeles Kings || 3–1 || 21–18–3
|- align="center" bgcolor="#CCFFCC"
| 43 || 17 || @ Oakland Seals || 3–1 || 22–18–3
|- align="center" bgcolor="white"
| 44 || 18 || @ St. Louis Blues || 2–2 || 22–18–4
|- align="center" bgcolor="#CCFFCC"
| 45 || 23 || Los Angeles Kings || 3–1 || 23–18–4
|- align="center" bgcolor="#CCFFCC"
| 46 || 25 || Chicago Black Hawks || 3–0 || 24–18–4
|- align="center" bgcolor="#CCFFCC"
| 47 || 26 || Montreal Canadiens || 3–2 || 25–18–4
|- align="center" bgcolor="#CCFFCC"
| 48 || 29 || Detroit Red Wings || 2–0 || 26–18–4
|- align="center" bgcolor="#CCFFCC"
| 49 || 30 || @ St. Louis Blues || 4–3 || 27–18–4
|-

|- align="center" bgcolor="#FFBBBB"
| 50 || 1 || @ Montreal Canadiens || 6–2 || 27–19–4
|- align="center" bgcolor="#CCFFCC"
| 51 || 2 || Pittsburgh Penguins || 7–3 || 28–19–4
|- align="center" bgcolor="#FFBBBB"
| 52 || 5 || @ Pittsburgh Penguins || 3–2 || 28–20–4
|- align="center" bgcolor="#CCFFCC"
| 53 || 8 || St. Louis Blues || 2–0 || 29–20–4
|- align="center" bgcolor="white"
| 54 || 9 || Philadelphia Flyers || 3–3 || 29–20–5
|- align="center" bgcolor="#FFBBBB"
| 55 || 12 || @ Oakland Seals || 3–2 || 29–21–5
|- align="center" bgcolor="#FFBBBB"
| 56 || 13 || @ Los Angeles Kings || 4–1 || 29–22–5
|- align="center" bgcolor="#FFBBBB"
| 57 || 15 || @ Toronto Maple Leafs || 6–2 || 29–23–5
|- align="center" bgcolor="#CCFFCC"
| 58 || 16 || Toronto Maple Leafs || 4–2 || 30–23–5
|- align="center" bgcolor="white"
| 59 || 19 || Detroit Red Wings || 1–1 || 30–23–6
|- align="center" bgcolor="#CCFFCC"
| 60 || 23 || Boston Bruins || 9–0 || 31–23–6
|- align="center" bgcolor="#CCFFCC"
| 61 || 26 || Chicago Black Hawks || 5–3 || 32–23–6
|-

|- align="center" bgcolor="#FFBBBB"
| 62 || 1 || @ Boston Bruins || 8–5 || 32–24–6
|- align="center" bgcolor="#CCFFCC"
| 63 || 2 || St. Louis Blues || 2–1 || 33–24–6
|- align="center" bgcolor="white"
| 64 || 5 || @ Chicago Black Hawks || 4–4 || 33–24–7
|- align="center" bgcolor="#CCFFCC"
| 65 || 6 || @ Detroit Red Wings || 4–1 || 34–24–7
|- align="center" bgcolor="#CCFFCC"
| 66 || 8 || @ Pittsburgh Penguins || 5–3 || 35–24–7
|- align="center" bgcolor="white"
| 67 || 9 || Montreal Canadiens || 2–2 || 35–24–8
|- align="center" bgcolor="#CCFFCC"
| 68 || 12 || Pittsburgh Penguins || 4–3 || 36–24–8
|- align="center" bgcolor="#CCFFCC"
| 69 || 16 || Detroit Red Wings || 6–4 || 37–24–8
|- align="center" bgcolor="#CCFFCC"
| 70 || 19 || @ Minnesota North Stars || 4–2 || 38–24–8
|- align="center" bgcolor="#FFBBBB"
| 71 || 22 || @ Montreal Canadiens || 3–1 || 38–25–8
|- align="center" bgcolor="#CCFFCC"
| 72 || 23 || Boston Bruins || 4–2 || 39–25–8
|- align="center" bgcolor="#FFBBBB"
| 73 || 26 || @ Chicago Black Hawks || 6–4 || 39–26–8
|- align="center" bgcolor="white"
| 74 || 27 || @ Boston Bruins || 3–3 || 39–26–9
|- align="center" bgcolor="#CCFFCC"
| 75 || 29 || @ Toronto Maple Leafs || 4–2 || 40–26–9
|- align="center" bgcolor="#CCFFCC"
| 76 || 30 || Toronto Maple Leafs || 4–0 || 41–26–9
|-

Playoffs

Key:  Win  Loss

Player statistics
Skaters

Goaltenders

†Denotes player spent time with another team before joining Rangers. Stats reflect time with Rangers only.
‡Traded mid-season. Stats reflect time with Rangers only.

Awards and records

Transactions

Draft picks
New York's pick at the 1968 NHL Amateur Draft in Montreal, Quebec, Canada.

Farm teams

See also
1968–69 NHL season

References

New York Rangers seasons
New York Rangers
New York Rangers
New York Rangers
New York Rangers
Madison Square Garden
1960s in Manhattan